Houchang Nahavandi, also referred to as Houshang Nahavandi, (born 2 December 1932 in Rasht) is an Iranian professor and politician. Nahavandi was President of University of Tehran from 1971 to 1976 and was Minister of Science from August 27, 1978 to November 5, 1978. Nahavandi has lived in exile since 1979. Currently, he is a correspondent for the Académie des Sciences Morales et Politiques in France. Nahavandi is the author of several books.

in 2005, Nahavandi published The Last Shah Of Iran, a biography of Mohammad Reza Pahlavi.

Nahavandi also wrote the book Iran 4000 ans d'histoire with Yves Bomati, a book about the history of Iran.

References

Further reading
https://www.france24.com/fr/20100210-houchang-nahavandi-lancien-regime-avait-points-faibles-celui-ci-na-points-faibles

Ministers of science of Iran
Iranian academic administrators
Chancellors of the University of Tehran
Academic staff of the University of Tehran
People from Rasht
Living people
1932 births
Exiles of the Iranian Revolution
20th-century Iranian people
21st-century Iranian people